Mathur-I is a village in the Palakkad district, state of Kerala, India. It forms a part of the area administered by Mathur gram panchayat.

Demographics
 India census, Mathur-I had a population of 11,355 with 5,431 males and 5,924 females.

References

Mathur-I